Manuel María de Zamacona may refer to:

Manuel María de Zamacona y Murphy (1826–1904): Mexican politician and diplomat; Ambassador of Mexico to the United States (1878–1882).
Manuel María de Zamacona e Inclán (1862–?): son of Manuel María de Zamacona y Murphy; Ambassador of Mexico to the United States (1911).